Amari Cheatom is an American actor. He is knowns for his roles in Django Unchained and Crown Heights.

Filmography

Awards and nominations

References

External links
Amari Cheatom on IMDb

21st-century American male actors
Place of birth missing (living people)
Year of birth missing (living people)
American male television actors
Living people